Wang Shangyuan (born 2 June 1993) is a Chinese professional footballer who currently plays for Chinese Super League club Henan Songshan Longmen.

Club career
Wang Shangyuan started his football career in 2012 when he was promoted to Beijing Sangao's first team during the 2012 season. He scored ten goals in 21 appearances, but Beijing were knocked out from the group stage by finishing eighth place in the northern group.

In April 2013, Wang was invited to a brief trial at Premier League side Manchester City. He continued his trial in Europe and moved to Belgian Pro League side Club Brugge in June 2013. On 13 July 2013, he signed a three-year contract with the Blauw-Zwart after impressing on trial. He made his debut for the club on 26 July 2013 in a 2–0 win against Sporting Charleroi, scoring his first goal for the club as well. This was the first goal scored league-wide in the 2013–14 season. He also made his European continental debut against Śląsk Wrocław in the 2013-14 UEFA Europa League in the third qualifying round. Wang started most of the club's matches at the beginning of the 2013-14 season; however, he was dropped to the reserves after Michel Preud'homme took over as manager.

On 27 February 2015, Wang joined Chinese Super League side Guangzhou Evergrande Taobao on a free transfer. He made his debut for the club on 22 March 2015 in a 1–1 draw against Changchun Yatai. Wang became a regular during the 2015 season when the club faced an injury crisis. He scored his first goal for the club on 5 July 2015 in a 7–0 win against Chongqing Lifan. On 22 February 2017, Wang scored twice in a 7–0 home win against Eastern in the 2017 AFC Champions League.

On 30 June 2018, Wang was loaned to fellow top tier side Henan Jianye for the rest of the 2018 season. He made his debut for the club on 18 July 2018 in a 2–1 away defeat against Beijing Guoan. On 7 November 2018, he scored his first goal for the club in a 4–0 home win against Guizhou Hengfeng, which ensured Henan's stay in the top flight for the following season. In February 2019, Wang transferred to the club on a permanent basis.

International career
On 10 December 2019, Wang made his international debut in a 1-2 defeat to Japan in the 2019 EAFF E-1 Football Championship.

Career statistics

Club statistics
.

International statistics

Honours

Club
Guangzhou Evergrande
Chinese Super League: 2015, 2016, 2017
AFC Champions League: 2015
Chinese FA Cup: 2016
Chinese FA Super Cup: 2016, 2017, 2018

References

External links
 

1993 births
Living people
Chinese footballers
People from Zhengzhou
Footballers from Henan
Association football forwards
Club Brugge KV players
Belgian Pro League players
Chinese Super League players
China League Two players
Guangzhou F.C. players
Henan Songshan Longmen F.C. players
Chinese expatriate sportspeople in Belgium
Expatriate footballers in Belgium
Chinese expatriate footballers